Khoma Gewog (Dzongkha: མཁོ་མ་) is a gewog (village block) of Lhuntse District, Bhutan.

References 

Gewogs of Bhutan
Lhuntse District